Hovsep Aznavur (1854, London - June 1935, Cairo) was an Ottoman Armenian architect. He is noted for his construction plans for the Bulgarian St. Stephen Church of Istanbul, Turkey.

Biography 
Born in London in 1854, Aznavur's family moved to Istanbul in 1867. Aznavur completed his studies at the Academy of Fine Arts in Rome. Some of his best known works are Bulgarian St. Stephen Church, Mısır Apartment and Aznavur Passage. His workshop was located at Saint Pierre Han in Galata.

Asnavur was active in Armenian community life. In 1921, he became a founding member of the Ramgavar Party, one of the three major historic Armenian political parties. He escaped from Istanbul after the Armenian genocide and died at the end of June 1935 in Cairo, Egypt.

References

Sources
 Pamukçiyan, Kevork. IV. Biyografileriyle Ermeniler, Ermeni Kaynaklarından Tarihe Katkılar, yayına hazırlayan: Osman Köker, Aras Yayıncılık, Istanbul, August 2003.
 Short biography of Hovsep Aznavur 
 Tigran Khzmalyan. Armenian Architects of Istanbul: Online Exhibition, March 27, 2015
 Stefan Bulgar Kilisesi 

1854 births
1935 deaths
Ethnic Armenian architects
Architects from the Ottoman Empire
British people of Armenian descent
Armenians from the Ottoman Empire
Artists from London
19th-century people from the Ottoman Empire